Gharni Dam, is an earthfill dam on Gharni river near Sirur, Latur district in the state of Maharashtra in India.

Specifications

Purpose
 Irrigation

See also
 Dams in Maharashtra
 List of reservoirs and dams in India

References

Dams in Latur district
Dams completed in 1969
1969 establishments in Maharashtra